Wet chemistry is a form of analytical chemistry that uses classical methods such as observation to analyze materials. It is called wet chemistry since most analyzing is done in the liquid phase. Wet chemistry is also called bench chemistry since many tests are performed at lab benches.

Materials
Wet chemistry commonly uses laboratory glassware such as beakers and graduated cylinders to prevent materials from being contaminated or interfered with by unintended sources. Gasoline, Bunsen burners, and crucibles may also be used to evaporate and isolate substances in their dry forms. Wet chemistry is not performed with any advanced instruments since most automatically scan substances. Although, simple instruments such as scales are used to measure the weight of a substance before and after a change occurs. Many high school and college laboratories teach students basic wet chemistry methods.

History
Before the age of theoretical and computational chemistry, wet chemistry was the predominant form of scientific discovery in the chemical field. This is why it is sometimes referred to as classic chemistry or classical chemistry. Scientists would continuously develop techniques to improve the accuracy of wet chemistry. Later on, instruments were developed to conduct research impossible for wet chemistry. Over time, this became a separate branch of analytical chemistry called instrumental analysis. Because of the high volume of wet chemistry that must be done in today's society and new quality control requirements, many wet chemistry methods have been automated and computerized for streamlined analysis. The manual performance of wet chemistry mostly occurs in schools.

Methods

Qualitative methods 
Qualitative methods use changes in information that cannot be quantified to detect a change. This can include a change in color, smell, texture, etc.

Chemical tests 

Chemical tests use reagents to indicate the presence of a specific chemical in an unknown solution. The reagents cause a unique reaction to occur based on the chemical it reacts with, allowing one to know what chemical is in the solution. An example is Heller's test where a test tube containing proteins has strong acids added to it. A cloudy ring forms where the substances meet, indicating the acids are denaturing the proteins. The cloud is a sign that proteins are present in a liquid. The method is used to detect proteins in a person's urine.

Flame test 
The flame test is a more well known version of the chemical test. It is only used on metallic ions. The metal powder is burned, causing an emission of colors based on what metal was burned. For example, calcium (Ca) will burn orange and copper (Cu) will burn blue. Their color emissions are used to produce bright colors in fireworks.

Quantitative methods 
Quantitative methods use information that can be measured and quantified to indicate a change. This can include changes in volume, concentration, weight, etc.

Gravimetric analysis 

Gravimetric analysis measures the weight or concentration of a solid that has either formed from a precipitate or dissolved in a liquid. The mass of the liquid is recorded before undergoing the reaction. For the precipitate, a reagent is added until the precipitate stops forming. The precipitate is then dried and weighed to determine the chemicals concentration in the liquid. For a dissolved substance, the liquid can be filtered until the solids are removed or boiled until all the liquid evaporates. The solids are left alone until completely dried and then weighed to determine its concentration. Evaporating all the liquid is the more common approach.

Volumetric analysis 
Titration is called volumetric analysis since it relies on volume measurements to determine the quantity of a chemical. A reagent with a known volume and concentration is added to a solution with an unknown substance and concentration. The amount of reagent required for a change to occur is proportional to the amount of the unknown substances. This reveals the amount of the unknown substance present. If no visible change is present, an indicator is added to the solution. For example, a pH indicator changes color based on the pH of the solution. The exact point where the color change occurs is called the endpoint. Since the color change can occur very suddenly, it is important to be extremely precise with all measurements.

Colorimetry 
Colorimetry is a unique method since it has both qualitative and quantitative properties. Its qualitative analysis involves recording color changes to indicate a change has occurred. This can be a change in shading of the color or a change into a completely different color. The quantitative aspect involves sensory equipment that can measure the wavelength of colors. Changes in wavelengths can be precisely measured and help indicate changes.

Uses
Wet chemistry techniques can be used for qualitative chemical measurements, such as changes in color (colorimetry), but often involves more quantitative chemical measurements, using methods such as gravimetry and titrimetry. Some uses for wet chemistry include tests for:

 pH (acidity, alkalinity)
 concentration
 conductivity (specific conductance)
 cloud point (nonionic surfactants)
 hardness
 melting point
 solids or dissolved solids
 salinity
 specific gravity
 density
 turbidity
 viscosity
 moisture (Karl Fischer titration)

Wet chemistry is also used in environmental chemistry settings to determine the current state of the environment. It is used to test:

 Biochemical Oxygen Demand (BOD)
 Chemical Oxygen Demand (COD)
 eutrophication
 coating identification

It can also involve the elemental analysis of samples, e.g., water sources, for items like:

 Ammonia nitrogen
 Chloride
 Chromium
 Cyanide
 Dissolved oxygen
 Fluoride
 Nitrogen
 Nitrate
 Phenols
 Phosphate
 Phosphorus
 Silica
 Sulfate, sulfide

See also
 Wet laboratory

Further reading

References

Chemistry